Habra is a city in India. It may also refer to:

Habra I, a community development block in Barasat Sadar subdivision of North 24 Parganas district in the Indian state of West Bengal
Habra II, a community development block in Barasat Sadar subdivision of North 24 Parganas district in the Indian state of West Bengal
Habra (Vidhan Sabha constituency), an assembly constituency in North 24 Parganas district in the Indian state of West Bengal
Habra River, a river in Algeria

See also
La Habra (disambiguation)